A statue of the Akita dog Hachikō, remembered for his unwavering loyalty to his deceased owner, is installed outside Tokyo's Shibuya Station, in Japan.

History
The statue was recycled for the war effort during World War II.

In 1948, the Society for Recreating the Hachikō Statue commissioned Takeshi Andō, son of the original artist, to make a second statue. When the new statue appeared, a dedication ceremony occurred. The new statue, which was erected in August 1948, still stands and is a popular meeting spot. The station entrance near this statue is named "Hachikō-guchi", meaning "The Hachikō Entrance/Exit", and is one of Shibuya Station's five exits.

The Japan Times played an April Fools' joke on readers by reporting that the bronze statue was stolen a little before 2:00 AM on April 1, 2007, by "suspected metal thieves". The false story told a very detailed account of an elaborate theft by men wearing khaki workers' uniforms who secured the area with orange safety cones and obscured the theft with blue vinyl tarps. The "crime" was allegedly recorded on security cameras.

The city of Odate considered borrowing the statue during redevelopment of the Shibuya Station ahead of the 2020 Summer Olympics.

Reception
Time Out Tokyo says the statue "might be Japan's most famous example of public art". In 2019, Free Malaysia Today described the statue as "a 'must' visit when in Tokyo".

See also
 1934 in art
 1948 in art

Gallery

References

External links

 
 Statue of Hachiko at Fodor's
 Hachikō Statue at Lonely Planet

1934 establishments in Japan
1934 sculptures
1948 establishments in Japan
1948 sculptures
Bronze sculptures in Japan
Monuments and memorials in Japan
Outdoor sculptures in Tokyo
Sculptures of dogs
Buildings and structures in Shibuya
Statues in Japan